Mousumi Hamid (born 12 October 1988) is an actress and model from Bangladesh. She rose to prominence after becoming the 1st runner-up in LUX Channel I Superstar 2010. Since then, she worked in several TV shows such as Love Rectangle (Valobasar Chatushkone), Radio Cholocate and several others. Since 2013, Hamid has signed several films including Anonno Mamun's Blackmail (2015), Shafi Uddin's Full Length Love Story: Part II (2015) and Shamim Ahamed Roni's Mental (2015).

Early life
Hamid was born in Dhaka but her ancestral residence Tala, Satkhira in 1988. After completion of high school, Hamid moved to Khulna to pursue education in management studies and completed her education from Azam Khan Commerce College. After completion, she moved to Dhaka to pursue a career in media industry.

Career

Television
In 2011, Hamid took part in Bangladeshi fashion-based reality television series LUX Channel I Superstar, and ended up becoming the runner up in season finale. In 2011, she started her acting career with TV series Roshni (Lights). She later went to star in several other Bangladeshi TV shows such as Radio Cholocate (2012–2013) and Valobasar Chatushkone (2013–present).

Films
Hamid made her debut into Bangladesh film industry with Na Manush (2013) but came into mainstream films in 2014 with Hudsoner Bonduk. She is currently working on Anonno Mamun's Blackmail alongside Anisur Rahman Milon and Shafi Uddin's Purnodoirgho Prem Kahini 2 alongside Shakib Khan, Joya Ahsan and Emon. She will also make a cameo in Shamim Ahamed Roni's Mental.

Television

Filmography

Web series

Music Video

References

External links 

 
 
  official website. Archived from the Original on 19 November 2020.

Living people
Bangladeshi film actresses
Bangladeshi actresses
Bengali television actresses
Bangladeshi female models
People from Satkhira District
People from Khulna
Best Supporting Actress Bachsas Award winners
1988 births